Alice Jackson may refer to:
Alice Jackson, (b. 1958), American sprinter
Alice Jackson Stuart, (1913-2001), American educator
Alice White (rower), (b. 1993), British-New Zealand rower